Corey Frazier Ellis is an American lawyer.

Education 
Ellis received his Bachelor of Arts degree from Brown University in 1990 and a Juris Doctor from the University of Memphis School of Law in 1994.

Career 
Upon graduation from law school, Ellis worked in private practice for three years before becoming an assistant district attorney in Hendersonville, North Carolina. He joined the United States Attorney's Office for the Western District of North Carolina in 2005 and prosecuted white collar fraud including the ZeekRewards scam, and Buncombe County Sheriff, Bobby Medford.  In 2017 Attorney General Jeff Sessions created a position within the Department of Justice to police asset forfeiture.  In 2018 Ellis was appointed Director of Asset Forfeiture Accountability in the United States Department of Justice's Deputy Attorney General's Office.  Deputy Attorney General Rod Rosenstein named him as chief of staff before Attorney General Bill Barr selected him to serve as acting director of the Executive Office for United States Attorneys.

FBI 
From January 2021 to January 2022 he served as chief of staff to the Director of the Federal Bureau of Investigation, Christopher A. Wray.

United States attorney 
In December 2021, Attorney General Merrick Garland appointed Ellis interim United States attorney for the District of South Carolina. He was later appointed by Chief District Court Judge Bryan Harwell to be Interim United States Attorney. His term as Interim U.S. Attorney ended on July 25, 2022, when a Presidentially Appointed, Senate Confirmed U.S. Attorney Adair Ford Boroughs was sworn in.

References 

1968 births
Living people
United States Attorneys for the District of South Carolina
Brown University alumni
University of Memphis alumni
Federal Bureau of Investigation executives
United States Attorneys for the Western District of North Carolina
United States Attorneys